King's Lynn railway station is the northern terminus of the Fen line in the east of England, serving the town of King's Lynn, Norfolk.

The station and most trains calling are operated by Great Northern (with service to and from ), with some additional peak services being operated by Greater Anglia (to and from London Liverpool Street).

It has been the only station in the town since the closure of South Lynn railway station in 1959.

Early growth 
The Act for the Lynn and Ely Railway received Royal Assent on 30 June 1845. Work started on the line in 1846 and so the railway arrived at Lynn on 27 October 1846. The original line ran South to Downham with the first station after Lynn being St Germain's. It took another two years to reach Ely. Great Eastern Railway. Lynn, when opened was a Joint station (Lynn & Ely and Lynn & Dereham). However, on 22 July 1847 the Lynn & Ely and Lynn & Dereham were amalgamated to form the East Anglian Railway. A spur connecting the harbour was opened in 1849, and at one point was a complicated network of lines, boasting two swing bridges, serving premises on and around the town's South Quay. Another short branch, about three-quarters of a mile (1200 m) long, connecting the docks was opened in 1862 by the King's Lynn Docks & Railway Company. The railway was initially not welcomed by the port authorities in King's Lynn; they predicted that sea-bound trade would decline, and were later proved correct when through-trains to London ended up carrying the majority of freight to the capital.

Lynn opened as a junction station. The Lynn & Dereham Railway Act of 21 July 1845, authorised a line which weaved a  route to Dereham. The line opened to Narborough, on 27 October 1846, the same day the Lynn & Ely opened to Downham. The line was extended to Swaffham, on 10 August 1847, opening in stages between 1846 and 1848. The line ran out of Lynn in a South-Easterly direction with Middleton being the first station after Lynn. this later became part of the Great Eastern Railway.

Expansion followed with the opening of several branches. A line running north to the seaside resort of Hunstanton was opened in 1862, a journey celebrated by former Poet Laureate John Betjeman in a short BBC film about the line.

The Hunstanton line included Wolferton station, which served the Royal Family's Sandringham House, and so became the route of hundreds of Royal Trains. Since Royal services to London had to first pass through King's Lynn before heading south to King's Cross, crowds on King's Lynn station cheering the Royal Train became one of the town's cherished and memorable traditions.

King's Lynn also received services from the Midland and Great Northern Joint Railway system, whose main station serving the town was in nearby South Lynn; a short shuttle service ran from King's Lynn to South Lynn as often as twenty times a day. The station opened in 1886, serving Sutton Bridge and Spalding to the west. Prior to the opening of South Lynn station, there had been a simple single platform station serving West Lynn, on the west bank of the River Ouse. An early constituent of the M&GN, the Lynn & Fakenham Railway, had used King's Lynn station, but ran into it from the north, via Gaywood Junction. This line was abandoned on the opening of the station at South Lynn. The "Lynn Avoiding" line was the last link in the chain which brought the eastern lines, which had reached Norwich in 1882, and Cromer in 1887, in direct contact with the lines west of Lynn.

King's Lynn's original station building was replaced by the current building by the builder Robert Skipper of Dereham in 1871–72, and was significantly extended in 1910; the original of 1846 was a somewhat rudimentary timber building on the site of the goods yards of the time. The Railway Cafe was opened in 1910 and celebrated the centenary of its opening in 2010.

Closures 
 
At their peak, the railways in and around King's Lynn employed hundreds of people, but Britain's extensive railway cutbacks in the late 1950s and the following decades badly affected King's Lynn's railway services. The 1959 closure of the former M&GN's lines resulted in the closure of South Lynn railway station on 28 February that year, depriving King's Lynn of services to Norwich and Spalding. The dubious safety of a bridge over the Ouse, a very short way north-west of South Lynn station, was allegedly a significant factor in the closure of the whole route, and was demolished later that year. A section of this line about half a mile (800 m) long was left open for freight into the 1990s, transporting materials like oil and limestone to the sugar beet factory (since closed).

Other services suffered a similar fate in the following years. Passenger services to Hunstanton were discontinued in 1969, services to Wisbech (via Magdalen Road) ended in 1968, and the line to Dereham was closed in the same year, save for a three-mile section for sand freight from King's Lynn to Middleton. The closure of these services left only one passenger route in operation—services to Ely and Cambridge on the Fen Line.

Freight services to King's Lynn were less swiftly, but even more extensively, affected by cutbacks. Campbell's made heavy use of rail transport after opening its factory in Lynn in 1959, its curtain-sided wagons being one of the more distinctive sights on the Fen Line; but with the withdrawal of Speedlink services in the early 1990s, this traffic was lost to road transport. The branch to the harbour was progressively shortened before its final closure at around the same time, and the line to the docks closed as well (except for a short stub allowing the aforementioned freight trains from Middleton to change direction), the last train passing over the line in June 1994. The station's once-extensive goods yard suffered the same fate, the site being taken over by the station's car park and two large shops.

To the present 

Before electrification in 1992, InterCity (latterly Network SouthEast) locomotives operated most services, normally hauling British Rail Mark 2b coaches. Many of these services featured full-service restaurant cars. The locomotives were usually Class 37 diesel-electrics, Freight services were operated by a similar array of diesel locomotives, as well as Class 20s, Class 31s, and the occasional Class 08 shunter. Off-peak links were often provided by Metro-Cammell diesel multiple units, such as the Class 101.

For many years after electrification, and the consequent removal of diesel locomotives from passenger services, Class 317 electrical multiple units operated all services out of King's Lynn. While they were not as comfortable as the previous fleet of locomotive-hauled coaches, they quickly developed a reputation for reliability. Today's services are mostly operated by Class 387s. Greater Anglia operate weekday peak-hour services between King's Lynn and London Liverpool Street using Class 379s which will be replaced by class 720 in 2021.
 
The only freight activity around King's Lynn today is the sand trains which run from the Middleton Towers branch to either Goole, Barnsley or Doncaster. These are usually operated by GB Railfreight, using Class 66 locomotives. Occasionally, enthusiast railtours operate on this branch as well.

The station is primarily served by Great Northern as part of its service from King's Cross. Outside peak hours, services run non-stop between London and Cambridge as part of a half-hourly Cambridge service; one train per hour then continues beyond Cambridge, stopping at all stations on the Fen Line to King's Lynn. A small number of services, operated by Greater Anglia during weekday peak hours, travel to Liverpool Street instead. In the past, through-trains from London always started from Liverpool Street, but services were shifted to King's Cross in the 1990s.

Ticket barriers were installed in 2012.

Restoration work began in April 2013 as a station rewire which quickly grew into a heritage inspired project. The view taken was to restore the station to a 1949 state with British Rail branding and reminisces of the GER and LNER railways. The paint scheme was based upon a GER steam unit which had blue red and gold. GER cast iron benches were made locally by East Coast Castings in Wotton and BR style totems were hand-made alongside LNER station clocks. Platforms were resurfaced and LED lighting installed throughout public areas along with new CCTV. A Norfolk county flagpole was installed to replace the old one and canopies and roof restored and or replaced. The overall cost was under £1.1million. The project was jointly funded by First Capital Connect and Network Rail. The project's completion was marked with Michael Portillo unveiling a plaque in the booking hall area on 22 July 2014.

It was originally intended that King's Lynn would be included in the Thameslink Programme, so that most trains for London from King's Lynn would be diverted on to the Thameslink route and on to St Pancras, Farringdon rather than terminating at King's Cross. However, this did not occur and King's Lynn trains continue to provide the fast service from Cambridge to Kings Cross.

See also 
 Railways in Norfolk
 Fen Line
 King's Lynn
 South Lynn railway station

References

External links 
 
 
 The railway bridges of South Lynn, among other remnants, exploring disused railways around King's Lynn.

King's Lynn
Railway stations in Norfolk
DfT Category D stations
Former Great Eastern Railway stations
Railway stations in Great Britain opened in 1846
Railway stations served by Govia Thameslink Railway
Greater Anglia franchise railway stations
1846 establishments in England
Train driver depots in England
Grade II listed buildings in Norfolk